Peer review may refer to:

 Clinical audit, a systematic review of healthcare against an explicit standard
 Clinical peer review, the process by which health care professionals evaluate each other's clinical performance
 Medical peer review, the process of refereeing healthcare practitioner decisions
 Peer review, the scholarly process of screening papers or grant applications
 Peer Review, a DLC for Portal 2
 Peer Review (magazine), an academic magazine 
 Physician peer review, the process by which physicians evaluate each other to promote better quality of care
 Scholarly peer review, the process of refereeing scholarly papers
 Sham peer review, the process of pseudo-review done for political purposes, often in healthcare
 Software peer review in software development
 Technical peer review in systems engineering
More at :Category:Peer review

See also 
 Performance appraisal in the workplace